Richard Kipkemei Limo (born 18 November 1980) is a Kenyan athlete. He specializes in long distance track events. He won the 5000 m gold medal at the 2001 World Championships in Athletics.

Limo was born in 1980 in Cheptigit village, Uasin Gishu District. After primary school he went to polytechnic and received a grade in electrical wiring in 1996. He did not start running, until 1997 when he joined a training camp located near his home. The next year he won the silver medal at the junior race of World Cross Country Championships. The same year he broke the world junior record at 3000 m, by running in 7:36.76 minutes, but missed the World Junior Championships. He won the Cross Zornotza in 1999 and the Trofeo Alasport cross country meeting in 2002. In 2001 he became world champion and was world's best performer of the year at 5000 metres with his time 12:56.72, which remains his personal record.

Since 2004 Limo has not been much in the limelight, but has since switched to marathon racing. He won the Giro Media Blenio 10K in 2004. He was the runner-up in the 2007 Amsterdam Marathon, his debut where he consequently set a new personal best (2:06:45).

He won his first marathon race in 2010, running a time of 2:09:56 for victory at the Rock 'n' Roll San Diego Marathon. He slowed to a halt just before the finish line in celebration of his first win over the distance. He finished the 2011 Reims Marathon in third place, finishing behind debutant Demessew Tsega.

Richard Limo is married to Rose Tarus with two children, born in 2000 and 2002. He is 1.67 m tall and has a mass of 52 kg. He is not related to Benjamin Limo or Felix Limo, both also Kenyan runners.

Achievements

Marathons

2007 Amsterdam Marathon - 2nd (PB 2:06:45)
2008 Rotterdam Marathon - 4th
2008 Chicago Marathon - 10th
2009 Rotterdam Marathon - 9th

Personal bests
1500 metres - 3:37.59 min (1999)
3000 metres - 7:32.23 min (2001)
5000 metres - 12:56.72 min (2001)
10,000 metres - 26:50.20 min (2002)
3000 metres steeplechase - 8:20.67 min (1998)
Marathon - 2:06:45 (2007)

References

External links

Richard Limo: Young Kenyan on Top of the World
Focus on Africans
Marathoninfo profile

1980 births
Living people
People from Uasin Gishu County
Kenyan male long-distance runners
Kenyan male marathon runners
Kenyan male steeplechase runners
Olympic athletes of Kenya
Athletes (track and field) at the 2000 Summer Olympics
World Athletics Championships medalists
Athletes (track and field) at the 1998 Commonwealth Games
Commonwealth Games medallists in athletics
Commonwealth Games bronze medallists for Kenya
Kenyan male cross country runners
World Athletics Championships winners
Athletes (track and field) at the 1999 All-Africa Games
African Games competitors for Kenya
Medallists at the 1998 Commonwealth Games